Spitler is a surname. Notable people with the surname include:

 Austin Spitler (born 1986), American football linebacker
 Johannes Spitler (1774–1837), American furniture painter
 Mark Spitler, American scientist

See also
 Spittle (surname)
 Spittler, surname